Mark Knowles and Daniel Nestor were the defending champions, but lost in the quarterfinals this year.

Andrei Pavel and Alexander Waske won in the final 6–3, 7–6(7–1), against Rafael Nadal and Bartolomé Salvá Vidal.

Seeds
All seeds receive a bye into the second round.

Draw

Finals

Top half

Bottom half

External links
Draw

Dou